Aladár Kovácsi (11 December 1932 – 8 April 2010) was a Hungarian modern pentathlete and Olympic champion.

Olympics

Kovácsi won a gold medal in the modern pentathlon at the 1952 Summer Olympics in Helsinki with the Hungarian team.

References

External links
Picture of Aladár Kovácsi on his 75th birthday

1932 births
2010 deaths
Hungarian male modern pentathletes
Olympic modern pentathletes of Hungary
Modern pentathletes at the 1952 Summer Olympics
Olympic gold medalists for Hungary
Olympic medalists in modern pentathlon
Sportspeople from Budapest
World Modern Pentathlon Championships medalists
Medalists at the 1952 Summer Olympics